In nine-dimensional geometry, a rectified 9-simplex is a convex uniform 9-polytope, being a rectification of the regular 9-orthoplex.

There are 9 rectifications of the 9-orthoplex. Vertices of the rectified 9-orthoplex are located at the edge-centers of the 9-orthoplex. Vertices of the birectified 9-orthoplex are located in the triangular face centers of the 9-orthoplex. Vertices of the trirectified 9-orthoplex are located in the tetrahedral cell centers of the 9-orthoplex.

These polytopes are part of a family 511 uniform 9-polytopes with BC9 symmetry.

Rectified 9-orthoplex 

The rectified 9-orthoplex is the vertex figure for the demienneractic honeycomb.
  or

Alternate names 
 rectified enneacross (Acronym riv) (Jonathan Bowers)

Construction 
There are two Coxeter groups associated with the rectified 9-orthoplex, one with the C9 or [4,37] Coxeter group, and a lower symmetry with two copies of 8-orthoplex facets, alternating, with the D9 or [36,1,1] Coxeter group.

Cartesian coordinates 
Cartesian coordinates for the vertices of a rectified 9-orthoplex, centered at the origin, edge length  are all permutations of:
 (±1,±1,0,0,0,0,0,0,0)

Root vectors 
Its 144 vertices represent the root vectors of the simple Lie group D9. The vertices can be seen in 3 hyperplanes, with the 36 vertices rectified 8-simplexs cells on opposite sides, and 72 vertices of an expanded 8-simplex passing through the center.  When combined with the 18 vertices of the 9-orthoplex, these vertices represent the 162 root vectors of the B9 and C9 simple Lie groups.

Images

Birectified 9-orthoplex

Alternate names 
 Rectified 9-demicube
 Birectified enneacross (Acronym brav) (Jonathan Bowers)

Images

Trirectified 9-orthoplex

Alternate names 
 trirectified enneacross (Acronym tarv) (Jonathan Bowers)

Images

Notes

References 
 H.S.M. Coxeter:
 H.S.M. Coxeter, Regular Polytopes, 3rd Edition, Dover New York, 1973
 Kaleidoscopes: Selected Writings of H.S.M. Coxeter, edited by F. Arthur Sherk, Peter McMullen, Anthony C. Thompson, Asia Ivic Weiss, Wiley-Interscience Publication, 1995,  
 (Paper 22) H.S.M. Coxeter, Regular and Semi Regular Polytopes I, [Math. Zeit. 46 (1940) 380-407, MR 2,10]
 (Paper 23) H.S.M. Coxeter, Regular and Semi-Regular Polytopes II, [Math. Zeit. 188 (1985) 559-591]
 (Paper 24) H.S.M. Coxeter, Regular and Semi-Regular Polytopes III, [Math. Zeit. 200 (1988) 3-45]
 Norman Johnson Uniform Polytopes, Manuscript (1991)
 N.W. Johnson: The Theory of Uniform Polytopes and Honeycombs, Ph.D. (1966)
  x3o3o3o3o3o3o3o4o - vee, o3x3o3o3o3o3o3o4o - riv, o3o3x3o3o3o3o3o4o - brav, o3o3o3x3o3o3o3o4o - tarv, o3o3o3o3x3o3o3o4o - nav, o3o3o3o3o3x3o3o4o - tarn, o3o3o3o3o3o3x3o4o - barn, o3o3o3o3o3o3o3x4o - ren, o3o3o3o3o3o3o3o4x - enne

External links 
 Polytopes of Various Dimensions
 Multi-dimensional Glossary

9-polytopes